Mount Epperly is a  or perhaps  mountain in the Sentinel Range, Ellsworth Mountains in Antarctica. It overlooks Cervellati Glacier to the northeast and Ramorino Glacier to the east-northeast. Loretan returned the next year and reclimbed the route for a film. In 1999, the American climbers  Conrad Anker and Jim Donini failed in their attempt over the west ridge. The third successful ascent was by the Chilean Camilo Rada and Australian Damien Gildea via a new route over the south face in December 2007. Their GPS measurements on top suggested a height 153 m above the official one.
This mountain is named after Robert Epperly (born 1926) who spent time during the International Geophysical Year of 1957–1958 in Antarctica. Bob served in the US Navy at that time. He lived his latter years in Worthington, Massachusetts and is interred there.

See also
 Mountains in Antarctica

Maps
 Vinson Massif.  Scale 1:250 000 topographic map.  Reston, Virginia: US Geological Survey, 1988.
 Antarctic Digital Database (ADD). Scale 1:250000 topographic map of Antarctica. Scientific Committee on Antarctic Research (SCAR). Since 1993, regularly updated.

References

Ellsworth Mountains
Mountains of Ellsworth Land
Four-thousanders of Antarctica